Spaghetti Funk was an Italian collective of hip hop musicians.

History
The crew was founded in 1994 by Articolo 31 with the leader J-Ax, from the writer Raptuz and the historian rapper Space One, inspired by an idea of Franco Godi.
Initially the crew was broader. It included several members of the hip hop/funk Italian as Chief, Solo Zippo, Huda, Ena, Posi Argento, Pooglia Tribe, Dj Enzo e Dj Jad.

References

Italian hip hop groups
Musical groups from Milan